Gorny is a rural locality (a selo) in Kara-Yakupovsky Selsoviet, Chishminsky District, Bashkortostan, Russia. The population was 712 as of 2010. There are 10 streets.

Geography 
Gorny is located 14 km southeast of Chishmy (the district's administrative centre) by road. Kara-Yakupovo is the nearest rural locality.

References 

Rural localities in Chishminsky District